Sambhunath Pandit (1820–1867) was the first Indian to become judge of Calcutta High Court in 1863. He served in that position from 1863 to 1867.

Son of Sadasiv Pandit, he belonged to a Kashmiri Pandit family. He was brought up in Bhowanipur, Kolkata. As a child, he went to Lucknow to study Urdu and Persian. On return to Kolkata, he joined the Oriental Seminary.

Active life
He was a founder member of British Indian Association.

Bhowanipur Brahmo Samaj
In the History of the Brahmo Samaj, Sivanath Sastri writes, "In the month of June 1852, a number of influential men of that suburban town (meaning Bhowanipur) assembled at the house of the late Sambhunath Pandit, latterly a Judge of Calcutta High Court, and established an Association under the name of Jnan Prakasika Sabha, or "Truth Revealing Society", whose object it was to promote the spiritual enlightenment of its members. It was virtually a Brahmo Samaj, though the name was different. Sambhunath Pandit became its president, Babu Annadaprasad Banerjee, a pleader of the High Court, vice-president, and Baboo Harishchandra Mukherji of the Hindu Patriot fame its secretary... From the first anniversary of the Society held in 1853, it was duly and formally installed as Bhowanipur Brahmo Samaj." It followed the Adi Samaj form of divine service.

He published a book entitled On the Being of God.

A government hospital  and an important road in Bhowanipur are named after him.

References

Scholars from Kolkata
Brahmos
1820 births
1867 deaths
Oriental Seminary alumni
University of Calcutta alumni
Indian social workers
Indian social reformers
Indian lawyers
Indian jurists
Indian judges
19th-century Indian judges
20th-century Indian writers
Indian male writers
20th-century Indian male writers
Indian religious writers
Social workers from West Bengal
Judges of the Calcutta High Court